This is a list of Billboard magazine's ranking of the year's top country and western singles of 1958.

Don Gibson had the year's No. 1 single with "Oh Lonesome Me"/"I Can't Stop Loving You".  Gibson also had the year's No. 9 record with "Blue Blue Day".

Johnny Cash had three of the year's top 10 country & western singles: "Guess Things Happen That Way"/"Come in, Stranger" at No. 3; "The Ways of a Woman in Love"/"You're the Nearest Thing to Heaven" at No. 6; and "Ballad of a Teenage Queen" at No. 7.

RCA Victor led all labels with 13 of the top 50 singles.  Columbia Records and Decca Records followed with nine each. With the popularity of Johnny Cash and Jerry Lee Lewis, Sun Records had seven. Cadence Records had four top singles, all by the Everly Brothers.

See also
List of Billboard number-one country songs of 1958
Billboard year-end top 50 singles of 1958
1958 in country music

Notes

References

1958 record charts
Billboard charts
1958 in American music